The 1960 Western Kentucky Hilltoppers football team represented Western Kentucky State College (now known as Western Kentucky University) as a member of the Ohio Valley Conference (OVC) during the 1960 NCAA College Division football season. Led by fourth-year head coach Nick Denes, the Hilltoppers compiled an overall record of 2–6–1 with a mark 1–4–1 conference play, tying for sixth place in the OVC. The team's captain was Herb Wassom.

Schedule

References

Western Kentucky
Western Kentucky Hilltoppers football seasons
Western Kentucky Hilltoppers football